The Rio Urubu State Forest is a state forest in the state of Amazonas, Brazil.

Location

The Rio Urubu State Forest is in the municipality of Rio Preto da Eva, Amazonas.
The Caverna do Maroaga Environmental Protection Area is to the north, and the Biological Dynamics of Forest Fragments Project Area of Relevant Ecological Interest is to the south.
The Urubu River forms the northeast boundary of the forest.

History

The Rio Urubu State Forest was created by state decree 23.993 of 22 December 2003.
Objectives were to manage use of natural resources, maintain and protect water resources and biodiversity, recover areas of degraded land, conduct scientific research and  environmental education, and support sustainable development of natural resources in the surrounding areas.
The forest became part of the Central Amazon Ecological Corridor, created in 2002.

Environment

The forest is in the interfluvial region between the Rio Negro and the Uatumã River.
About half of the terrain is slopes cut by streams.
Features include extensive areas of buriti palms in the Urubu River floodplain, rapids and waterfalls of great scenic beauty.
The area is among the most diverse in tree species of all tropical forests in the world.
Common tree species are Couroupita guianensis, Dinizia excelsa, Hevea brasiliensis, Aniba rosaeodora,  Licaria brasiliensis, Aniba canelilla and Dipteryx odorata.
The rich fauna includes rare species such as  harpy eagle (Harpia harpyja),  grey-winged trumpeter (Psophia crepitans),  Guyanan red howler (Alouatta macconnelli) and red-handed tamarin (Saguinus midas).

There are three settlements in the forest.
The forest has a detailed plan for a special economic zone with potential activities including large-scale timber extraction by private companies or local communities, extraction of non-timber products, with the possibility of a community management model, ecotourism, scientific research and conservation.

Notes

Sources

State forests of Brazil
Protected areas of Amazonas (Brazilian state)
2003 establishments in Brazil